King Yí of Zhou, personal name Ji Xie, was the ninth king of the Chinese Zhou Dynasty. Estimated dates of his reign are 885–878 BC or 865–858 BC.

He was preceded by his great-uncle, King Xiao of Zhou, who may have overthrown his father. In the third year of his reign, King Yi sided with Marquis of Ji in a dispute with Duke Ai of Qi and executed Duke Ai by boiling him to death in a large cauldron. King Yi installed Duke Ai's younger half-brother Jing on the throne, later known as Duke Hu of Qi.

During his reign there were wars in the south with the State of Chu and the Dongyi. According to the Shiji, during his reign the royal power was not strong and the regional rulers failed to pay obeisance to the court.

He was succeeded by his son, King Li of Zhou.

Family
Queens:
 Wang Ji, of the Ji clan of E, a princess of E by birth; the mother of Crown Prince Hu

Sons:
 Crown Prince Hu (890–828 BC), ruled as King Li of Zhou from 877–828 BC

Ancestry

See also
Family tree of ancient Chinese emperors

References

878 BC deaths
Zhou dynasty kings
9th-century BC Chinese monarchs
Year of birth unknown